The Lordship of Salona, after 1318 the County of Salona, was a Crusader state established after the Fourth Crusade (1204) in Central Greece, around the town of Salona (modern Amfissa, known in French as La Sole and Italian as La Sola).

History 
The first lord of Salona, Thomas I d'Autremencourt (or de Stromoncourt), was named by Boniface of Montferrat, the King of Thessalonica, in 1205. After the fall of the Thessalonica to the forces of Epirus, and a short-lived Epirote occupation in c. 1210–1212, Salona became a vassal of the Principality of Achaea, but later came under increasing dependency from the Duchy of Athens. In 1318, the lordship came under the rule of the Catalan Fadrique family, the leader of the Catalan Company, who claimed the title of Count of Salona. Among the eighteen Catalan vassals of the area in 1380-1 the Count of Salona ranks first above Count Demitre and the Margrave of Bodonitsa. Due to the unpopularity of the Dowager Countess Helena Asanina Kantakouzene, in 1394, the town opened its gates to the Ottoman sultan Bayezid I. It fell for a short time into the hands of the Despotate of the Morea c. 1402. The Despot Theodore I Palaiologos sold Salona to the Knights Hospitaller in 1404, but it fell again to the Ottomans in 1410.

Rulers 

d'Autremencourt/de Stromoncourt family
 Thomas I d'Autremencourt (r. 1205–1210)
 Thomas II d'Autremencourt (r. 1212–1258), son of Thomas I
 William d'Autremencourt  (r. 1258–1294), son of Thomas II
 Thomas III d'Autremencourt (r. 1294–1311), son of William, killed at the Battle of the Cephissus
Catalan Conquest
 Roger Deslaur (r. 1311–1318)
 Alfonso Fadrique (r. 1318–1338)
 Peter Fadrique (r. 1338–1350/55), eldest son of Alfonso
 James Fadrique (r. c. 1355–1366), second son of Alfonso
 Boniface Fadrique (r. 1366–c. 1375), brother of James
 Louis Fadrique (r. c. 1375–1380/81), son of James
Navarrese Conquest (1380)
 Maria Fadrique (r. 1382–1394), daughter of Louis, under the regency of her mother, Helena Asanina Kantakouzene
 First Ottoman conquest (1394 – c. 1402)
 Byzantine Moreot conquest (1402–1404)
 Knights Hospitaller (1404–1410)
 Second Ottoman conquest (1410)

See also 
 Latin Bishopric of Salona

References

Sources 
 
 
 
 

 
 
1205 establishments in Europe
Principality of Achaea
States of Frankish and Latin Greece
Duchy of Athens
Knights Hospitaller
States and territories disestablished in the 1410s
Former principalities